The Rajgir Zoo Safari or Rajgir Wildlife Safari is a Wildlife safari located in Rajgir, Bihar, India, was opened to public on 16 February 2022.

The main wild animal species includes Chital, Sambar, Black buck, Hog Deer, Barking Deer, Wild Boar, Sloth Bear, Indian Leopard, Royal Bengal Tiger and Asiatic Lion Considered to be one of its kind, the Zoo Safari is blessed with natural forest varying from large grasslands and Bamboo thickets to dense Sal Forest. Visitors can also enjoy seeing variety of bird and butterfly species here. One can see different water birds like Kingfishers, cormorants in the natural ponds present in the safari. Apart from watching wild animals in forest, efforts has been taken to sensitize the visitors about wildlife and their conservation. Ome of its main attraction is a selfie point with life-size wild animal statues. It has a unique interpretation centre with informative videos of wild animals. It also has a painting series 
showing Wildlife in their habitat, challenges faced by Wildlife for survival and role of forest department in Forest and wildlife Conservation. It also has a digital butterfly zone, an orientation centre, a 180 degree 3D theatre and shapath Stambha. The unique feature of Zoo Safari is that the wild animals at Rajgir Zoo Safari are not in cages but free over a large natural forest area. Visitors are allowed to watch animals from a secured environment-friendly vehicle from close distance in their natural habitat. This makes this Zoo Safari different from other Zoos.

Location
The zoo is located in the Nalanda district, around 85 km southeast of Patna. It is surrounded by the Vaibhargiri and Swarnagiri hills on both side. It is about half a kilometre from the Rajgir-Gaya road in Rajgir Wildlife Sanctuary.

It is 101 Kms (approx) from the Bihar Capital City, Patna by Road. The nearest airport to the safari is Gaya Airport which is 71 Kms from the safari by road. The safari is also accessible through the Railway Station. The nearest Railway Station is Rajgir Railway station. Gaya Railway station is 60 Kms away from the Safari by Road.

Features
The zoo has a fence for keeping the fawns, cubs, and sick animals safe, feeding areas for both the herbivores and carnivores, and another fence to rule out any possibility of the safari animals escaping to the adjoining forest areas. There are also ponds of water for the safari animals to drink from and a security arrangement with watch towers.

Attractions
It would be carved out of the existing forest area and would be divided into five broad zones one each for lion, tiger, leopard, bear, herbivores, aviary zone for birds and a small butterfly park and a microtelescope will be install on Vaibhgiri mountain to watch sky view of Zoo Safari.

Facilities
The tourists will begin witness greenery from the entrance gate itself. The Safari will have special arrangement for kids and elderly people. There will be waterfalls all around to increase the treat to the eyes. It will have cycling track, shooting range, mobile cafeteria, an interpretation centre, an orientation centre. It will have also solar powered armoured buses to take the visitors inside the safari area and comfortable shades and bamboo hut for tourists stay. Many exciting things will be available on the hills including climbing the rock, people will go from one side to the other side with the help of the rope in some area the butterfly area and a park theme will be prepared in a manner-oriented in it. It will have all facilities of tourists for professional and amateur wildlife photography.

See also
 Etawah Safari Park
 Sanjay Gandhi Biological Park

References

Zoos in India
2017 establishments in Bihar
Rajgir
Tourist attractions in Nalanda district